Coca paste (paco, basuco, oxi) is a crude extract of the coca leaf which contains 40% to 91% cocaine freebase along with companion coca alkaloids and varying quantities of benzoic acid, methanol, and kerosene. In South America, coca paste, also known as cocaine base and, therefore, often confused with cocaine sulfate in North America, is relatively inexpensive and is widely used by low-income populations. The coca paste is smoked in tobacco or cannabis cigarettes and use has become widespread in several Latin American countries. Traditionally, coca paste has been relatively abundant in South American countries such as Colombia where it is processed into cocaine hydrochloride ("street cocaine") for distribution to the rest of the world. The caustic reactions associated with the local application of coca paste prevents its use by oral, intranasal, mucosal, intramuscular, intravenous or subcutaneous routes. Coca paste can only be smoked when combined with a combustible material such as tobacco or cannabis.

History 
Coca paste use began in Bolivia and Peru in the early 1970s, first in the capital cities and then in other towns and rural areas. In a few years its use had spread to Argentina, Brazil, Colombia, Ecuador, and some Mexican cities near the border with the United States.

In Argentina, cocaine paste was sold for about 30 cents per dose in 2006, enough for a powerful two-minute high. However, its price has increased because of higher demand, among other reasons.

Preparation and effects
Crude cocaine preparation intermediates are marketed as cheaper alternatives to pure cocaine to local markets while the more expensive end product is exported to United States and European markets. Freebase cocaine paste preparations can be smoked. The psychological and physiological effects of the paco are quite severe. Media usually report that it is extremely toxic and addictive. According to a study by Intercambios, media appear to exaggerate the effects of paco. These stereotypes create a sense that nothing can be done to help a paco addict and thus stand in the way of rehabilitation programs.

Basuco, Colombia
Basuco is the term used for cocaine paste in Colombia. Basuco is derived from the Spanish word for trash (basura), literally meaning "dirty trash" (of cocaine), referring to the paste left at the bottom of a barrel after cocaine production. Basuco is mostly smoked, either rolled like a cigarette with tobacco or cannabis, or more commonly from selfmade pipes. These are often improvised from PVC so users will inhale toxic plastic components. Basuco is very addictive and said to be "more potent than the crack cocaine found across European and American cities". Basuco users may take other psychoactive agents, like industrial alcohol and MDMA to manage the drug effects, the high and the paranoia.

Per the UN Office on Drugs and Crime (UNODC) in Colombia there were 4,644 basuco users in Bogotá alone; the drug's illicitness and accompanying homelessness prohibit an accurate count.

Since September 2012, a "Mobile Centre for Attention to Drug Addicts" (CAMAD) has been providing basic human services with an interdisciplinary team moving by bus in Bogota's worst affected neighbourhoods and working in a prison. Three hospitals participate with walk-in treatment, amongst them the public Hospital Centro Oriente. Gustavo Petro, the Mayor of Bogotá, who established CAMAD, will be finishing his last term in October 2015, and the future of the program is uncertain. Since CAMAD cannot offer services such as HIV testing, needle exchange, or safe injection sites, its "...current levels of progress are not comparable with those of countries that have invested greater resources in the implementation of such schemes", per UNODOC. CAMAD has been criticised for not doing  enough by a Colombian non-governmental organisation called "Technical Social Action" (ATS), and by  "right-leaning politicians and the public for negotiating terms with the criminal gangs that control [certain] areas".

Paco in Argentina, Brazil and Uruguay

Cocaine paste is very popular through several South American countries including Argentina, Brazil and Uruguay and is referred to as paco or pasta base in Brazil, Uruguay and Chile. 
Between 2001 and 2005, the use of paco in Argentina increased by 200%, with more than 150,000 young people taking it regularly.

In 2007, crackdowns in Peru and Bolivia forced traffickers to move to Argentina to produce cocaine which, according to the Los Angeles Times, is ideal for its "advanced chemical industry, [its] porous border with Bolivia and a notoriously corrupt police force." Eventually, this prompted traffickers to sell their byproduct to locals. The use underscores a significant shift in both Argentina and its larger neighbour Brazil, which in just a few years have become sizable cocaine consumers. Brazil now ranks as the second largest total consumer of cocaine in the world after the United States, per the United States Department of State.

Slang terms

Argentina
Paco
Basoco
Pico
Base
Tubo
Pasta Base

Chile
Angustia (anguish)
Cocaína de los pobres (poor man's cocaine)
Pasta (Paste)
Pasta Base (Base Paste)
Palo Rosa (Mixed with heroin or opium)
Mono (Monkey, also withdrawal symptom. Mixed with tobacco)
Marciano (Martian. Mixed with marijuana)

Italy
Pasta di coca
Base
Boccia
Cruda

Oxi
Oxi (abbr. from Portuguese oxidado) is a stimulant drug based on cocaine paste originally developed in the Brazilian Amazon forest region. It is reportedly a mixture of cocaine paste, gasoline, kerosene and quicklime (calcium oxide). This description may be a garbled account of an acid-base extraction procedure. Its popularity has soared in the last decade, in part due to its strongly addictive effect and lower price than other common drugs. While in the 1980s it could be found mainly in the Amazon region, the police in major Brazilian cities have recently reported significant drug arrests.

See also 
 Black cocaine
 Black tar heroin
 Crack cocaine

References

External links 
 Paco Under Scrutiny: The cocaine base paste market in Argentina, Uruguay and Brazil 
 A new scourge sweeps through Argentine ghettos: 'paco' Christian Science Monitor
 Lost in an abyss of Drugs, and entangled by poverty New York Times, July 30, 2009
The 10p cocaine by-product turning Argentina's slum children into the living dead The Observer, February 21, 2010

Cocaine
Adulteration